Đorđe Gagić (born December 28, 1990) is a Serbian professional basketball player for Borac Čačak of the Basketball League of Serbia and the ABA League. He also represented the Serbian national basketball team in international competition.

Professional career

Early years
Gagić played youth basketball in FMP, Superfund, Vojvodina Srbijagas, and Crvena zvezda. In December 2009, he signed for his first senior team, Mornar from Montenegro. After two years spent playing there, he signed for Serbian professional club Hemofarm until the end of 2011–12 season.

Partizan
In July 2012, Gagić signed a four-year contract with the Serbian club Partizan. In his first season with Partizan, he won the Adriatic League and the Serbian League. In his second season, he won his second and club's 13th straight Basketball League of Serbia title by defeating Crvena zvezda with 3-1 in the final series. Despite him not having good season, he exploded in the final series averaging 12.5 points and 6 rebounds per game.

In the stumbling first half of 2014–15 season for Partizan, Gagić played the starting center position and averaged 9.6 points and 4 rebounds over 18 Adriatic League games. On 3 February 2015, Gagić requested a contract termination due to unpaid salaries, which the club publicly classified as 'treason' a day later.

2015–present
On 11 February 2015, Gagić terminated his contract with Partizan and signed with Royal Halı Gaziantep of the Turkish Basketball League for the rest of the season.

On August 3, 2015, he signed a one-year contract with Italian club Enel Brindisi.

On April 30, 2016, Gagić signed with Iberostar Tenerife for the rest of the 2015–16 ACB season.

On July 1, 2016, Gagić signed with Tsmoki-Minsk for the 2016–17 season. On February 20, 2017, he left Tsmoki-Minsk and signed with Turkish club İstanbul BB for the rest of the 2016–17 BSL season.

On September 13, 2017, Gagić signed with Yeşilgiresun Belediye for the 2017–18 BSL season. On December 26, 2017, he parted ways with Yeşilgiresun after averaging 8 points and 4 rebounds in BSL. On January 3, 2018, he returned to Partizan.

On December 5, 2020, he signed with Lietkabelis.

On September 6, 2022, he has signed with ADA Blois Basket 41 of the LNB Pro A.

On December 29, 2022, he signed with Borac Čačak of the Basketball League of Serbia.

National team career
Gagić represented Serbian national team at the FIBA EuroBasket 2013 in Slovenia. He averaged 3.5 points and 2.5 rebounds per game for Serbia.

Career statistics

Euroleague

|-
| style="text-align:left;"| 2012–13
| style="text-align:left;"| Partizan
| 10 || 2 || 14.1 || .485 || .000 || .735 || 3.3 || .2 || .3 || .1 || 5.7 || 5.4
|-
| style="text-align:left;"| 2013–14
| style="text-align:left;"| Partizan
| 23 || 1 || 15.0 || .382 || .000 || .632 || 3.4 || 1.0 || .5 || .2 || 3.3 || 3.6
|- class="sortbottom"
| style="text-align:left;"| Career
| style="text-align:left;"|
| 33 || 3 || 14.8 || .416 || .000 || .681 || 3.4 || .8 || .4 || .2 || 4.0 || 4.1

See also 
 List of Serbia men's national basketball team players

References

External links
 Đorđe Gagić at aba-liga.com
 Đorđe Gagić at eurobasket.com
 Đorđe Gagić at euroleague.net
 Đorđe Gagić at fiba.com
 Đorđe Gagić at tblstat.net

1990 births
Living people
ABA League players
ADA Blois Basket 41 players
Basketball League of Serbia players
BC Lietkabelis players
BC Tsmoki-Minsk players
CB Canarias players
Centers (basketball)
Gaziantep Basketbol players
İstanbul Büyükşehir Belediyespor basketball players
KK Borac Čačak players
KK Crvena zvezda youth players
KK Hemofarm players
KK Mornar Bar players
KK Partizan players
Liga ACB players
Medalists at the 2013 Summer Universiade
New Basket Brindisi players
People from Benkovac
Serbia men's national basketball team players
Serbian expatriate basketball people in Belarus
Serbian expatriate basketball people in Italy
Serbian expatriate basketball people in Lithuania
Serbian expatriate basketball people in Montenegro
Serbian expatriate basketball people in Spain
Serbian expatriate basketball people in Turkey
Serbian men's basketball players
Serbs of Croatia
Croatian expatriate basketball people in Serbia
Universiade bronze medalists for Serbia
Universiade medalists in basketball
Yeşilgiresun Belediye players